Barbara Jaracz ( Grabarska; born 8 June 1977) is a Polish chess Woman Grandmaster (2007).

Chess career 
From the middle of 1990s, Jaracz is one of the leading Polish women chess player. In 1995, she first time appeared in the Polish Women's Chess Championship's final. Later, Jaracz won two medals in this tournament: silver (1997) and bronze (2001). In 1995, Jaracz represented Poland in European Youth Chess Championship under the age of 18. In 1997, she participated in World Junior Chess Championship under the age of 20 in Żagań.

Jaracz played for Poland in European Team Chess Championship:
 In 1997, won individual bronze medal at second board in the 2nd European Team Chess Championship (women) in Pula (+4, =3, -0).
 In 1999, at first reserve board in the 3rd European Team Chess Championship (women) in Batumi (+1, =2, -2).

Personal life 
Her husband Paweł Jaracz is also Chess Grandmaster and one of the leading Polish chess players.

References

External links 
 
 
 
 Barbara Jaracz player profile at 365chess.com
 Barbara Grabarska player profile at 365chess.com

1977 births
Polish female chess players
Chess woman grandmasters
Living people